Visalur is a village in the Kumbakonam taluk of Thanjavur district, Tamil Nadu.

Demographics 

As per the 2001 census, Agarathur had a total population of 2017 with 1036 males and 981 females. The sex ratio was 947. The literacy rate was 67.69.

References 

 

Villages in Thanjavur district